Enni Mälkönen (born 25 September 1990) is a Finnish rally co-driver. She won the World Rally Championship-3 co-drivers' championship in 2022.

Career
Mälkönen won WRC3 co-drivers' championship in 2022, making her the first woman to do so. The two top drivers in the class (Lauri Joona and Jan Černý) changed co-drivers during the season, while Mälkönen continued as Sami Pajari's co-driver throughout the season. Previously, no woman had won the championship in any WRC class.

Mälkönen previously competed in show jumping, but after her horse was injured, she decided to change to rallying. Mälkönen's father has also driven a rally. Mälkönen herself made her debut in 2012. AKK-Motorsport organized coaching, in which she participated in the entrance exams.

Results

WRC results 

* Season still in progress.

References

External links
 Rally results profile

1990 births
Living people
Finnish rally co-drivers
World Rally Championship co-drivers
Place of birth missing (living people)
21st-century Finnish people